The O'Comhaltain family (Irish: Ó Comhaltáin), sometimes simply Colton, were a clan in County of Donegal written in the Annals of the Four Masters.

See also
Colton (surname)

References 

Irish clans